Li Zhangyu (born 12 August 1988) is a Chinese cyclist.

Career
He won a gold medal in the Men's 1km time trial C1-2-3 event at the 2012 Summer Paralympics.

References

Living people
1988 births
Paralympic gold medalists for China
Paralympic silver medalists for China
Paralympic bronze medalists for China
Paralympic cyclists of China
Chinese male cyclists
Sportspeople from Hangzhou
Medalists at the 2012 Summer Paralympics
Cyclists from Zhejiang
Paralympic medalists in cycling
Cyclists at the 2012 Summer Paralympics
Medalists at the 2020 Summer Paralympics
Cyclists at the 2020 Summer Paralympics
20th-century Chinese people
21st-century Chinese people